Acilius is a holarctic genus of diving beetles in the family Dytiscidae and typically has a life cycle that is univoltine.

Despite the prevalence of some species, one species, A. duvergeri, is listed as vulnerable on the IUCN Red List.

Species
The genus Acilius contains the following 13 extant species in 2 subgenera:
Subgenus Acilius:
 Acilius abbreviatus Aubé, 1838
 Acilius athabascae Larson, 1975
 Acilius canaliculatus (Nicolai, 1822)
 Acilius confusus Bergsten, 2006
 Acilius fraternus (Harris, 1828)
 Acilius japonicus Brinck, 1939
 Acilius kishii Nakane, 1963
 Acilius mediatus (Say, 1823)
 Acilius semisulcatus Aubé, 1838
 Acilius sinensis Peschet, 1915
 Acilius sulcatus (Linnaeus, 1758)
 Acilius sylvanus Hilsenhoff, 1975
Subgenus Homoelytrus
 Acilius duvergeri Gobert, 1874

Extinct species
These three extinct species are known only from fossils:
 †Acilius florissantensis Wickham, 1909
 †Acilius oeningensis (Heer, 1847)
 †Acilius praesulcatus Lomnicki, 1894

References

Dytiscidae genera